The Major-General commanding the Household Division commands the Household Division of the British Army and is also the General Officer Commanding London District. In British Army parlance, "The Major-General" always refers to the Major-General commanding the Household Division. The Major-General has sole responsibility for the Service aspect of all State and ceremonial occasions within London District. The office holds executive command of the Household Division and of any other units brought into London for providing military security to the Sovereign, the Royal Palaces as well as for ceremonial purposes and is the main channel of communication between the Household Division and the Monarch. He or she is appointed by The Sovereign, and will previously have commanded a Regiment or Battalion within the Household Division.

List of Commanders
The holders of this office include:

Commanding Home District
 General the Duke of Cambridge 1804–

Major-General Commanding the Brigade of Guards (1856–1870)
Before 1856, orders for the Foot Guards were communicated to the Field Officer in Brigade Waiting, a rotational appointment.
Major-General Lord Rokeby  1856–1861
Major-General James Robertson Craufurd 1861–1863
Major-General Lord Frederick Paulet 1863–1867
Major-General the Hon. James Alexander Lindsay 1867–1868
Major-General Frederick William Hamilton  1868–1870

Major-General Commanding the Brigade of Guards and General Officer Commanding Home District (1870–1906)
Major-General Prince Edward of Saxe-Weimar  1870–1876 late Grenadier Guards
Major-General Sir Frederick Stephenson  1876–1879 late Scots Guards
Major-General Sir George Higginson  1879–1884 late Grenadier Guards
Major-General Sir Reginald Gipps  1884–1889 late Scots Guards
Major-General Philip Smith  1889–1892 late Grenadier Guards
Major-General The Lord Methuen  1892–1897 late Scots Guards
Major-General Sir Henry Trotter  1897–1903 late Grenadier Guards
Major-General Sir Laurence Oliphant,  1903–1906 late Grenadier Guards

Major-General Commanding the Brigade of Guards and General Officer Commanding London District (1906–1950)
Major-General Sir Frederick Stopford,  1906–1909 late Grenadier Guards
Major-General Sir Alfred Codrington,  1909–1913 late Coldstream Guards
Lieutenant-General Sir Francis Lloyd  1913–1918 late Grenadier Guards
Major-General Sir Geoffrey Feilding  1918–1920 late Coldstream Guards
Major-General Sir George Jeffreys  1920–1924 late Grenadier Guards
Major-General Lord Ruthven of Freeland,  1924–1928 late Scots Guards
Major-General Sir Charles Corkran,  1928–1932 late Grenadier Guards
Major-General Albemarle Cator,  April – November 1932 late Scots Guards
Major-General Sir Charles Grant,  1932–1934 late Coldstream Guards
Major-General Sir Bertram Sergison-Brooke,   1934–1938 late Grenadier Guards
Lieutenant-General Sir Andrew Thorne,  1938–1939 late Grenadier Guards
Lieutenant-General Sir Bertram Sergison-Brooke,   1939–1942 late Grenadier Guards
Lieutenant-General Sir Arthur Smith,  1942–1944 late Coldstream Guards
Lieutenant-General Sir Charles Loyd,  1944–1947 late Coldstream Guards
Major-General Sir John Marriott,  1947–1950 late Scots Guards

Major-General Commanding the Household Brigade and General Officer Commanding London District (1950–1968)
Major-General Sir Julian Gascoigne,  1950–1953 late Grenadier Guards
Major-General Sir George Johnson,  1953–1957 late Scots Guards
Major-General Sir Rodney Moore,  1957–1959 late Grenadier Guards
Major-General Sir George Burns,  1959–1962 late Coldstream Guards
Major-General Sir John Nelson,  1962–1965 late Grenadier Guards
Major-General Sir Basil Eugster,  1965–1968 late Irish Guards

Major-General Commanding the Household Division and General Officer Commanding London District (1968–)
Major-General Lord Michael Fitzalan-Howard,  1968–1971 late Life Guards
Major-General Sir James Bowes-Lyon,  1971–1973 late Grenadier Guards
Major-General Sir Philip Ward,  1973–1976 late Welsh Guards
Major-General Sir John Swinton,  1976–1979 late Scots Guards
Major-General Sir Desmond Langley,  1979–1983 late The Life Guards
Major-General Sir James Eyre,  1983–1986 late Royal Horse Guards
Major-General Sir Christopher Airy,  1986–1989 late Scots Guards
Major-General Sir Simon Cooper,  1989–1991 late Life Guards
Major-General Sir Robert Corbett,  1991–1994 late Irish Guards 
Major-General Sir Iain Mackay-Dick,  1994–1997 late Scots Guards
Major-General Sir Evelyn Webb-Carter,  1997–2000 late Grenadier Guards
Major-General Sir Redmond Watt,  2000–2003 late Welsh Guards
Major-General Sir Sebastian Roberts,  2003–2007 late Irish Guards
Major-General Sir William Cubitt,  2007–2011 late Irish Guards 1998–2011 (commissioned into Coldstream Guards, 1977–98)
Major-General Sir George Norton  2011–2013 late Grenadier Guards 
Major-General Sir Edward Smyth-Osbourne  2013–2016 late Life Guards
Major-General Sir Ben Bathurst  2016–2019 late Welsh Guards
Major General Chris Ghika  2019–Present late Irish Guards

References

Ceremonial officers in the United Kingdom
Senior appointments of the British Army
Household Division (United Kingdom)